Sir John Barrington, 9th Baronet (8 December 1752 – 5 August 1818) was a British politician who sat in the House of Commons from 1780 to 1796.

Born at Red Lion Street in London and baptised at St Andrew, Holborn, Barrington was the eldest son of Sir Fitzwilliam Barrington, 8th Baronet and his wife Jane Hall, daughter of Matthew Hall. He was educated at Eton College from 1761 to 1770 and entered Trinity Hall, Cambridge in 1771. In 1792, he succeeded his father as baronet.

Barrington entered Parliament at the 1780 general election, sitting as a member of parliament (MP) for Newtown, the same constituency his uncle John had before represented. He was re-elected in 1784 and 1790. He decided not to stand at the 1796 general election.

Barrington died unmarried aged 66 at his seat Barrington Hall, Essex on 5 August 1818. and was buried at St Mary the Virgin, Hatfield Broadoak. He was succeeded in the baronetcy by his younger brother Fitzwilliam.

References

1752 births
1818 deaths
Alumni of Trinity Hall, Cambridge
Baronets in the Baronetage of England
British MPs 1780–1784
British MPs 1784–1790
British MPs 1790–1796
Members of Parliament for the Isle of Wight
People educated at Eton College